Shades of Liberty is the debut studio album from Belfast new wave/rock band Silent Running. It was released in 1984 by EMI, and produced by Peter Walsh.

Background
Prior to signing to EMI, Silent Running recruited George Beavis on keyboards and together the band recorded tracks such as "Speed of Life" for their proposed first album. However, Beavis was subsequently dismissed and replaced with Alex White. The line-up then recorded Shades of Liberty. Three singles were released from the album: "Emotional Warfare", "Young Hearts", and "Sticks and Stones". Despite attempts to gain commercial success, the band never achieved the desired breakthrough. "Young Hearts" was the only single to make a chart appearance in the UK, where it reached No. 92. Shades of Liberty failed to chart. Both "Young Hearts" and "Sticks and Stones" were released within the UK and Europe only, while "Emotional Warfare" was released in America and Europe.

Shades of Liberty was the band's only album release for EMI. A second album for EMI was planned and the single "No Faith is Blind" preceded it in 1985. However, the limited success of the single resulted in the label cancelling the second album and dropping the band. They would sign to Atlantic Records after, where they would record two albums.

Recording
The album was recorded at both The Manor and Windmill Lane Studios in Dublin, while it was mixed at The Manor and Air Studios. It was recorded during January–February 1984.

Release
The album was released by EMI Records in the UK, Europe and North America. In America and Canada, the album was titled Emotional Warfare, after the leading (and only American) single. The release featured slightly different front artwork, with a black background replacing the white of the European sleeve. The back artwork on the European and North America editions are completely different. The album has not seen a CD release, except an unofficial one by the Lost 80s Record Company in 2013. Despite many attempts and campaigns by an avid, loyal & active online fanbase to have an official release, the album has sadly been overlooked by companies like Cherry red/ Cherry pop in favour of less popular and less desired releases

Promotion
A music video was filmed to promote the "Emotional Warfare"  and "Young Hearts" singles. In 1984, the band appeared on UK TV show The Tube, where they performed "Emotional Warfare" and "Sticks and Stones". On the German TV show Musik Convoy, the band performed "Young Hearts".

Track listing

Critical reception

Upon release, the album received a five out of five star review in the Melody Maker magazine headlined "Silent Classic". In the American magazine Billboard, Shades of Liberty was included under the 'Recommended' section of the 'Pop' albums section. The magazine described the album as "U2-style wall of sound to a disco beat."

Chart performance

Singles

"Young Hearts"

Personnel
Silent Running
 Peter Gamble - vocals
 Tony Scott - guitar
 Alex White - keyboards
 Richard Collett - bass
 Ian Gault - drums

Additional personnel
 Peter Walsh - producer, engineer
 Jif - assistant engineer at Air
 Steve Chase - assistant engineer at The Manor
 Kevin Killen - assistant engineer at Windmill Lane
 Design RX - The Creative Department Ltd. - sleeve artwork
 Ursula Steiger - photography

References

1984 debut albums
Silent Running (band) albums
EMI Records albums
Albums produced by Peter Walsh